Andrey Vladimirovich Vlasov (born 28 February 1965) is a former Russian football player.

References

1965 births
Living people
Soviet footballers
FC Tyumen players
FC Tobol Kurgan players
Russian footballers
Russian Premier League players
Place of birth missing (living people)

Association football defenders